Epictia ater, or black blind snake, is a species of snake in the family Leptotyphlopidae.

References

Epictia
Reptiles described in 1940